Astrothelium eustomurale is a species of corticolous (bark-dwelling), crustose lichen in the family Trypetheliaceae. Found in Brazil, it was formally described as a new species in 2016 by lichenologists André Aptroot and Marcela Cáceres. The type specimen was collected by the authors in the Parque Natural Municipal de Porto Velho (Porto Velho, Rondônia), in a low-altitude primary rainforest. The presence of the lichen does not induce the formation of galls in the host. Black pycnidia are abundant on the pseudostromata. The area around and including the ostiole of the ascomata contains lichexanthone, a lichen product that causes these areas to glow yellow when lit with a long-wavelength UV light. The characteristics that distinguish it from other members of Astrothelium include the UV+ yellow nature of the ostiole; and the fused,  pseudostromatic ascomata that have a white cover contrasting it with the thallus colour.

References

eustomurale
Lichen species
Lichens described in 2016
Taxa named by André Aptroot
Taxa named by Marcela Cáceres
Lichens of North Brazil